Haji Jamiruddin Shafina Mohila College is a private women's college situated in 1990Rajpara Thana of Rajshahi, Principal= Tajbul Islam ; Assistant Professor= Md. Rafiqul Islam Bangladesh, in front of Mohisbathan Graveyard.

References

Universities and colleges in Bangladesh